Observation seaplanes are military aircraft with flotation devices allowing them to land on and take off from water. Their primary purpose was to observe and report enemy movements or to spot the fall of shot from naval artillery, but some were armed with machineguns or bombs. Their military usefulness extended from World War I through World War II. They were typically single-engine machines with catapult-launch capability and a crew of one, two or three. Most were designed to be carried aboard warships, but they also operated from seashore harbors.

Purpose and history

As the range of dreadnought battleship guns exceeded the distance from which shipboard personnel could observe shell splashes, observation aircraft were employed to:
 locate targets
 observe fall of shot for trajectory correction of large caliber naval artillery, and
 assess damage to enemy ships.
Wartime experience following the 1916 Battle of Jutland indicated additional usefulness for:
 directing submarines to positions for torpedo kill-shots on disabled enemy capital ships
 search and rescue missions, and
 air cover for infantry landing operations.
As aircraft carriers replaced battleships during World War II, observation seaplanes became vulnerable to radar-directed fighter aircraft and were reassigned for:
 reconnaissance and photo intelligence gathering,
 liaison, and
 radio communication support for local activities including amphibious operations.
Their shipboard roles were replaced by helicopters following the second world war.

Catapult and recovery procedures

After the plane was fueled and the engine warmed up, or the engine oil pre-heated, the pilot and observer would climb into their aircraft and rev the engine at full throttle. If the instrument panel readings were satisfactory, the pilot would brace for takeoff and signal the catapult operator he was ready. (0 to 80 in one-half second)

A capital ship preparing to recover its aircraft would steam into the wind and signal the aviator which way it would turn across the wind to provide a sheltered landing surface. When the plane was in position the ship would turn so the plane could land on the lee side as close as possible to the ship. The ship would tow a net along the water surface from a boom on the lee side, and the plane would taxi over the net so a hook on the underside of the float would engage the net allowing the plane to cut power and minimize relative movement of the plane with respect to the ship while the ship's crane hoisted the plane aboard.

United States

Two early aircraft assembled by Glenn Curtiss prior to formation of the Curtiss Aeroplane and Motor Company arrived aboard  on 24 April 1914 under the command of Henry C. Mustin to conduct aerial reconnaissance during the United States occupation of Veracruz. This was the first operational use of naval aircraft and the first time U.S. aviators of any service were the target of ground fire. On 5 November 1915 Mustin pioneered United States Navy catapult operations piloting an AB-2 seaplane launched from the cruiser . Interest in aerial observation increased as combat experience during first world war naval engagements demonstrated the inability of shipboard observers to accurately report fall of shot from the engagement range of dreadnought battleships. Nine Vought VE-7s were delivered in 1924 to be launched from battleship catapults. Subsequent design improvements were the Vought FU and Vought O2U Corsair. A few Berliner-Joyce OJ float planes were built for the Omaha class light cruiser catapults.
The Curtiss SOC Seagull became the dominant United States Navy catapult seaplane in 1935, until the number of Vought OS2U Kingfishers manufactured during the second world war exceeded the total production of all previous United States Navy observation seaplanes. In the absence of gunnery engagements with other warships, capital ships' observation seaplanes were used to spot naval gunfire support; but they proved so vulnerable to land-based fighters during the amphibious invasion of Sicily that their pilots flew conventional fighters spotting gunfire for the invasion of Normandy. A few Curtiss SC Seahawks remained operational into the late 1940s until helicopters became reliable enough to replace observation seaplanes.

United Kingdom

The plane was forced down by a broken fuel line after locating a few cruisers, and the clumsy procedure of finding calm water to offload and launch took so long that Engadines other planes were unable to meaningfully participate. This experience encouraged development of the Fairey III to be operated from aircraft carriers. The Supermarine Seagull II was the first British aircraft to be catapult launched in 1925. This design was improved as the Supermarine Walrus serving aboard capital ships of the Royal Navy through the second world war. Royal Navy preference for the flying boat fuselage was unusual among the shipboard observation seaplanes of the major naval powers.

Japan

When the Washington Naval Treaty left Japan with fewer capital ships than the United States or the United Kingdom, the country focused on aviation as a means of balancing naval power. Although only the Mitsubishi F1Ms were officially designated observation seaplanes, there were numerous similar reconnaissance seaplanes prefixed with the letter E rather than F. Japan produced observation and reconnaissance seaplanes in larger numbers and greater diversity than any other nation.

The first Japanese design was the Nakajima E2N in 1927. Increasing numbers of Nakajima E4Ns, Kawanishi E7Ks, and Nakajima E8Ns were manufactured before the Aichi E13A was produced in similar numbers to the American OS2U Kingfisher. Each of the  cruisers carried six seaplanes for the Kidō Butai reconnaissance role to allow the full complement of aircraft carrier planes to focus on their attack role. In addition to launching from capital ships, these Japanese seaplanes operated from fast seaplane tenders providing aviation support similar to aircraft carriers during fleet activities and amphibious operations.

Imperial Japanese Navy formalized B(Shipboard Attackers), C(Shipboard Reconnaissance), D(Shipboard Bomber), E(Reconnaissance Seaplane), F(Observation Seaplane), H(Flying Boat), N(Fighter Seaplane), R(Land-based Reconnaissance), Q(Maritime Patrol) and M(Special Purpose) classifications among others in the 1920s with different and overlapping requirements.

F Class
The F class planes were required to fly and climb fast with a level of defense including armament and in-combat maneuverability. This requirement was not only for the traditional spotter functions but also for 
1. Air cover for local operations away from a fleet, and
2. Repelling of enemy reconnaissance planes.
In contrast, a long operational range was the C, E, R and Q class primary requirement with less regard to armament and maneuverability.

Ministry of Navy issued a design request based on the F requirement in 1935, and comparative evaluation was carried out among F1A(Aichi), F1M(Mitsubishi) and F1K(Kawanishi) in flight testing.  After a modification, Mitsubishi F1M won the Navy production contract with excellent climb rate and maneuverability, and went into service in 1941 with a formal Navy type designation "Type Zero Observation Aircraft".  For a plane with floats, F1M2 performance was beyond expectations at the time with 9min36sec to 5000m climb rate, and especially its maneuverability in dog-fights where pilots rated it superior to the Zero Fighter-converted fighter seaplane A6M2-N, which often surprised the US fighter pilots in the early stages of the Pacific Theater of WWII.

The 3 machine gun armament, high rate of climb and maneuverability of F1M2 proved versatile for liaison and search & rescue purposes as well in the deteriorating trends in the war with a good survivability, and the biplane remained onboard cruisers and battleships until the end of the war in 1945. Because of the success of F1M2 design, no further design request in this category was issued by the Navy. However, more armament and speed were increasingly required for the E Class in the later stages of war.

Submarine-based Seaplane
This class of seaplanes was not pioneered in Japan (Cox-Klemin XS was made in the US in 1922, British Parnall Peto flew in 1925, and Arado Ar 231 was tried in 1941 by Germany) but this category uniquely reached deployment in Japan.

Germany

German rearmament in the 1930s included Heinkel He 60, Heinkel He 114 and Arado Ar 196 float planes for launch from the catapults of the Kriegsmarines capital ships. A few later operated aboard merchant raiders.

Comparison of ship-launched seaplanes
The following is not an exhaustive list, but compares the observation and reconnaissance seaplanes produced in greatest numbers.

Sources

Reconnaissance aircraft
Seaplanes